North Texas Historic Transportation (NTHT) was an American non-profit volunteer organization focusing on the history of trolleys in the Fort Worth, Texas, area.

References

See also 
Northern Texas Traction Company

Rail transportation in Texas
Culture of Fort Worth, Texas
Rail transportation preservation in the United States
Historical societies in Texas